Erika Metzger was a German international table tennis player.

Table tennis career
She lived in Berlin. In 1929 she and Mona Rüster won the first place medal for Germany in doubles in the Table Tennis World Championships.
Leading up to this win, Metzger won the 1927 International German Championships. She would control the first-place position in the German rankings in both 1928 and 1929.

Her three World Championship medals included a gold medal in the doubles with Mona Rüster at the 1929 World Table Tennis Championships.  She also won two English Open titles.

Accomplishments 
 Table Tennis World Championships
 1928 in Stockholm: 2nd place singles, 2nd place mixed doubles with Daniel Pecsi (HUN). Quarterfinal doubles
 1929 in Budapest: 1st place doubles with Mona Rüster (DE), Quarterfinal singles, quarterfinal mixed
 International German Championships
 1927 Berlin 1st place singles, 2nd place doubles with Wirz, 2nd place mixed with Daniel Pecsi (HUN)
 1928 Krefeld 2nd place singles, 1st place mixed with Daniel Pecsi (HUN)
 International Championships
 1928 England 1st place singles, 1st place mixed with Daniel Pecsi (HUN)
 1929 Switzerland 1st place singles, 1st place double with Ingeborg Carnatz.

See also
 List of table tennis players
 List of World Table Tennis Championships medalists

References 

German female table tennis players
20th-century German women